Belden, is an unincorporated community in Lee County, Mississippi, United States.  Most of the community is located within the city of Tupelo.

History
In the early 1900s, the settlement was a stop on the St. Louis–San Francisco Railway.  About that time, Belden had a post office, a school, two churches, several stores, and a population of about 350.

References

Geography of Lee County, Mississippi
Unincorporated communities in Mississippi